Arthur "Willie" James Wilmott (1888–1950) was an English international table tennis player and botanist.

Table tennis career
He won a bronze medal at the 1939 World Table Tennis Championships in the Swaythling Cup (men's team event) with Ken Hyde, Hyman Lurie, Ken Stanley and Ernest Bubley.

A national league competition 'The Wilmott Cup'was named after him.

Botany
He was the Deputy Keeper of Botany (Natural History) at the British Museum.

He worked at the British Museum from 1911 being promoted to Deputy Keeper in 1931 and specialized in the taxonomy of British flora. He wrote articles for the Journal of Botany.

See also
 List of England players at the World Team Table Tennis Championships
 List of World Table Tennis Championships medalists

References

English male table tennis players
1888 births
1950 deaths
World Table Tennis Championships medalists